Simwnt Fychan (c. 1530 – 1606) was a Welsh language poet and genealogist, probably born in Llanfair Dyffryn Clwyd in north-east Wales.

He was a colleague of the poet and scholar Gruffudd Hiraethog.

In 1567 Queen Elizabeth I of England appointed a commission to control the activities of "minstrels, rhymers and bards", in Wales.  They were summoned to meet at Caerwys and Simwnt Fychan was appointed "pencerdd", i.e. the senior bard.

References

Welsh-language poets
Welsh male poets
16th-century Welsh poets
17th-century Welsh poets
Year of birth uncertain
1530 births
1606 deaths